m-Cumenyl methylcarbamate is an insecticide used on cotton, fruit, vegetable and field crops. As of 1998, the Environmental Protection Agency listed it as an unregistered pesticide in the United States.

References

Carbamate insecticides
Isopropyl compounds
Phenol esters
Aromatic carbamates